Beyblade: Shogun Steel, known in Japan as  is the 2012 sequel and fourth installment of the Japanese anime television series based on Takafumi Adachi's manga series Beyblade: Metal Fusion, which itself is based on the Beyblade spinning top game from Takara Tomy and Hasbro. Directly following Beyblade: Metal Fury, the series is produced by d-rights and Nelvana under the direction of Kunihisa Sugishima. The series features a new hero named Zyro Kurogane, and his bey, Samurai Ifrit. The series began airing on TV Tokyo in Japan starting April 8, 2012. Following the original 15 minute long 38 episodes that aired in Japan, an additional seven half-hour episodes were released exclusively on DVD, bringing the total number of Japanese episodes to 45, and internationally to 26 half hour episodes.



Episode list

References

Metal Fusion Season 4
2012 Japanese television seasons